Oleh Polyvach (born 16 January 1975) is a Ukrainian bobsledder. He competed at the 1998 Winter Olympics and the 2002 Winter Olympics.

References

1975 births
Living people
Ukrainian male bobsledders
Olympic bobsledders of Ukraine
Bobsledders at the 1998 Winter Olympics
Bobsledders at the 2002 Winter Olympics
Sportspeople from Kyiv